Earth and Planetary Science Letters (EPSL) is a bimonthly peer-reviewed scientific journal covering research on physical, chemical and mechanical processes of the Earth and other planets, including extrasolar ones. Topics covered range from deep planetary interiors to atmospheres. The journal was established in 1966 and is published by Elsevier. The co-editors-in-chief are J. Adkins (California Institute of Technology), J.P. Avouac (California Institute of Technology), R. Bendick (University of Montana), L. Derry (Cornell University), M. Ishii (Harvard University), T.A. Mather (University of Oxford), W.B. McKinnon (Washington University in St. Louis), F. Moynier (Institut de Physique du Globe de Paris), Chiara Maria Petrone, Hans Thybo (Istanbul Technical University and University of Oslo), Alexander Webb.

Abstracting and indexing 
The journal is abstracted and indexed in:

According to the Journal Citation Reports, the journal has a 2020 impact factor of 5.255.

References

External links 
 

Publications established in 1966
Planetary science journals
Earth and atmospheric sciences journals
Elsevier academic journals
Space science journals
Geophysics journals
Meteoritics publications